Potka    is an assembly constituency in  the Indian state of Jharkhand.

Overview
According to the Delimitation of Parliamentary and Assembly Constituencies Order, 2008 of the Election Commission of India, Potka Assembly constituency covers  Potka police station, Palasbani, Asta, Kowali, Nunia, Kumarasol, Barakanjiya, Bomaro Bangoriya and Damudih gram panchayats in Musabani police station. Bagbera town and Karandih – Purihasa, Hargarghutu, Bagbera panchayats and Kitadih village in Jugsalai police station. It is a reserved constituency for Scheduled Tribes. Potka (Vidhan Sabha constituency) is part of Jamshedpur (Lok Sabha constituency).

Members of Assembly 
List of all MLAs from Potka Assembly constituency seat
(Bihar)
1977: Sanatan Sardar, Janata Dal 
1980: Sanatan Sardar, Bhartiya Janata Party
1985: Sanatan Sardar, Indian National Congress
1990: Hari Ram Sardar, Jharkhand Mukti Morcha
1995: Hari Ram Sardar, Jharkhand Mukti Morcha
2000: Maneka Sardar, Bharatiya Janata Party

List of all MLAs from Potka Assembly constituency seat
(Jharkhand)
2005: Amulya Sardar, Jharkhand Mukti Morcha
2009: Maneka Sardar, Bharatiya Janata Party
2014: Maneka Sardar, Bharatiya Janata Party
2019: Sanjib Sardar, Jharkhand Mukti Morcha

Election Results

2019

See also
Vidhan Sabha
List of states of India by type of legislature

References
Schedule – XIII of Constituencies Order, 2008 of Delimitation of Parliamentary and Assembly constituencies Order, 2008 of the Election Commission of India 

Assembly constituencies of Jharkhand
East Singhbhum district